Yarmouk Private University is a private university located on the international Highway connecting Damascus to Dara’a, 45 km (27.96 miles) away from Damascus. It lies amidst four counties, Damascus, Dar’a, Al-Suweida, and Al-Quneitera., Daraa Governorate, Syria, founded in 2007. It was created under Presidential Decree No. 262 on the 2007. Having ensured its possession of the various aspects of accreditation, it was inaugurated by the Minister of Higher Education on 29/10/2008.

Faculties 
 Faculty of Information and Communication Engineering
 Faculty of Business Administration
 Faculty of Civil Engineering
 Faculty of Architecture
 Faculty of Pharmacy
 Faculty of Design & Fine Arts

International agreements 
Below is a list of universities with which agreements have been signed until July 2012.
 University of Queensland in Australia
 University of Alberta in Canada
 Malaya University in Malaysia
 Multimedia University in Malaysia
 Weihenstephan University in Germany
 Al-Hosn University in the United Arab Emirates
 Wessex Institute in the United Kingdom
 Petra University in Jordan
 Yarmouk University in Jordan
 Cannes University in France
 University of Nicosia in Cyprus
 University of L'Aquila in Italy
 University of Barcelona in Spain

Membership in Arab Universities League 
In the 43rd round of the General Conference of Arab Universities League, held at Surt University in the Great People's Libyan Arab Jamahiriya on 20-21/4-2010, YPU officially became a participating member of the League.

References 
 Official website

Universities in Syria